William Michael Dennehy (born 17 February 1987) is an Irish former footballer and manager of Irish side Kerry FC. He was a left-sided midfielder but also played on the right wing. He is the older brother of Darren who is a former Irish footballer .

Playing career
Dennehy was a talented underage player in both soccer and Gaelic football. In the latter sport, he won the 2004 Munster Minor Football Championship with the Kerry minor team and also played with the Austin Stacks club in Tralee. He attended Irish language primary and secondary schools and is fluent in the Irish language.

Dennehy began his soccer playing career at local club Tralee Dynamos until the club disbanded and he joined Kingdom Boys. There, Dennehy was called into the Shelbourne team. After trials with Nottingham Forest, Aston Villa and Southampton, Dennehy was brought to Sunderland by Mick McCarthy after the midfielder impressed during a trial at the Stadium of Light. He signed for the Black Cats in January 2005.

Dennehy did not make a first-team appearance for Sunderland, but was a reserve and youth player at the club, and was given the squad number 34 for the 2006–07 season.

On 22 November 2007, Dennehy made the move from Wearside to Lancashire, joining Accrington Stanley on a one-month deal. There, he made his first ever league appearance on 5 December against Rochdale. After a further 6 appearances in June 2008, Dennehy was released by Sunderland.

On 27 August 2008, Dennehy signed for League of Ireland side Derry City. After just a few months, however, he opted to uproot and join Cork City, signing a two-year contract with the club on 27 January 2009.

On 25 January 2010, Dennehy moved from Cork City to Shamrock Rovers. He scored on his debut in a preseason friendly at Longford Town. He scored his first league goal for the Hoops on 9 April.

In 2010 and 2011 he won the League of Ireland championship with Shamrock Rovers. He also won the Setanta Cup in 2011 and played in the Europa League group stages netting against PAOK in November 2011:

In 2011, he was club top scorer (in all competitions) with 16 goals.

On 13 November 2013 Dennehy was released by Shamrock Rovers and 13 days later he rejoined Cork City and would be part of John Caulfield's squad for the 2014 season alongside his brother Darren Dennehy. After 2 successive seasons as runners up in the league to Dundalk, as well as 2015 FAI Cup runners up to the same opposition, it was announced that Dennehy would not remain at Cork for the 2016 season.

On 9 December 2015, Dennehy signed for Dublin club St Patrick's Athletic, along with younger brother Darren. Dennehy scored on his debut for Pats on 20 February 2016 in a 3–1 loss away to Bray Wanderers in the Leinster Senior Cup.

International career
Dennehy has played at U17, U18, U19, U21 and U23 levels for the Republic of Ireland national football team making his U21 debut in February 2007. He made his U23 debut in May 2010. Has part of the winning team in the Under-19 International La Manga Tournament in Spain in 2006.

Management
In December 2022, he was named as the manager of newly founded League of Ireland First Division team Kerry F.C..

Career statistics 
Professional appearances

Honours

Club
Shamrock Rovers
 League of Ireland (2): 2010, 2011
 League of Ireland Cup (1): 2013
 Setanta Sports Cup (2): 2011, 2013
 Leinster Senior Cup (2): 2012, 2013

St Patrick's Athletic
 League of Ireland Cup (1): 2016

Individual
 Shamrock Rovers Young Player of the Year (1): 2010

Gaelic Football
Kerry GAA
Munster Minor Football Championship (1): 2004

References

External links

1987 births
Living people
Austin Stacks Gaelic footballers
Gaelic footballers who switched code
Kerry inter-county Gaelic footballers
People from Tralee
Republic of Ireland association footballers
Republic of Ireland under-21 international footballers
Accrington Stanley F.C. players
Derry City F.C. players
Cork City F.C. players
Limerick F.C. players
Shamrock Rovers F.C. players
St Patrick's Athletic F.C. players
Sunderland A.F.C. players
Shelbourne F.C. players
League of Ireland players
Republic of Ireland under-23 international footballers
Association footballers from County Kerry
Expatriate footballers in England
Republic of Ireland expatriate association footballers
Republic of Ireland youth international footballers
English Football League players
Tralee Dynamos A.F.C. players
Association football wingers